Ken Hisatomi (久富 賢, born September 29, 1990) is a Japanese football player who plays as a midfielder for Vonds Ichihara.

Career
On 5 December 2013, Hisatomi was selected as Fujieda MYFC's player of the 2013 season by a fan blog.

Club statistics
Updated to 25 December 2021.

Honours
 Blaublitz Akita
 J3 League (2): 2017, 2020

References

External links
Profile at Blaublitz Akita

1990 births
Living people
Association football people from Saga Prefecture
Japanese footballers
J2 League players
J3 League players
Japan Football League players
Yokohama FC players
Matsumoto Yamaga FC players
Fujieda MYFC players
Blaublitz Akita players
Vonds Ichihara players
Association football midfielders